The Josefův Důl dam is a dam in the municipality of Josefův Důl in the Liberec Region of the Czech Republic. It dams the water of Kamenice river. It was built between 1976 and 1982 and is the largest dam in the Jizera Mountains. It has a height of 43 m and a capacity of 23 million cubic meters. It is used for drinking water so recreational activities are not permitted upon it.

References

Dams in the Czech Republic
Dams completed in 1982
1982 establishments in Czechoslovakia
20th-century architecture in the Czech Republic